Beerdarts (or beer darts) is a drinking game involving aluminum beer cans and metal darts. Although many variations exist, the basic idea is that players sit opposite one another with a beer can at their feet, and take turns throwing a dart at their opponent's can. If said dart punctures or makes contact with the can, various actions take place as detailed in the rules.

Rules
The game is best played with two players, and such a game requires two seats, some lightweight metal darts and several cans of beer, two to be placed as targets.

Each player sits with an unopened can of beer at their feet.

Players are permitted to use some kind of backboard behind the beer can to protect their legs and to make it easier to recover the dart thrown. This can be anything from a pizza  box to an official beer darts backboard.

Players then take turns throwing a dart at their opponent's beer. Consequences are:

 If a dart grazes a player's can but does not puncture it, that player must take one sip of beer from their own drink. A "sip" is approximately 1 fluid ounce (12 per standard can) 
 If a dart punctures a player's can, that player must drink beer from the can, down to at least the hole.
 If a dart breaks the plane created by the mouth hole (Evident through signs on the backside of the can or dart remaining in the hole) the drink must be finished.
If a player hits their opponent's can two turns in a row, they get darts back for another free turn.
 First player to finish their can loses and the opponent is crowned the winner.
This game often goes for multiple rounds. It should be determined before the game starts what constitutes a win. It could be, for example, that the first player to make their opponent consume one full beer is the winner, and the game ends. If playing in teams of 2 or more, a win could be making the opposing team consume a total of three full beers.

Variations
 Classic  Two players, one can each, with or without a mat or B-Team.
 Team The game can be played in teams, by adding further chairs. This involves four or more players, all using mats. One side forms a team to play against the other side.
 Party beerdarts  Many players seated in a circle, one can each, with or without a B-Team. In large groups, four or more, it is often established that shooting at a direct neighbor is prohibited, at least at first.
 Double beerdarts  Same rules as Classic beerdarts except two cans are stacked on top of each other. If the bottom can is punctured, the top can must be completely consumed before the bottom can is consumed down to the puncture.
 Engineering beerdarts  Four players, two per team. One shaken, unopened beer between each team. If the can is not punctured, the beer is not drank, and is reset if tipped. When the can is punctured, the beer must be shotgunned or otherwise drank as quickly as possible. Games typically go to 7.
 Missoula Beerdarts  Developed in Missoula, Montana. A water noodle is looped into a circle around the can of beer on the ground. A dart that sticks in the noodle is worth one point. A dart that lands on the ground inside the noodle is worth two points. A dart that punctures the can must be shotgunned. Play is to either 11 or 21 with two players on each side, with teammates on opposing sides (similar to horseshoes). Typically played at night with a spotlight, which requires a neutral person operating the light.
 Onlooker questions Asking how the game went and not participating requires the person that asks to drink two units of alcohol.

See also

List of drinking games

References

Drinking games
Beer culture